Morten Dons (born 29 December 1988) is a Danish racing driver currently competing in the European Le Mans Series. He made his debut in 2015. Having previously competed in the British GT and Ginetta GT5 Challenge Sweden amongst others.

Racing career
Dons began his career in 2006 in karting. In 2011 he switched to the Danish Formula Ford championship, he raced there from 2011–2012 ending 3rd in the standings in 2012. He also competed in the Formula Ford NEZ championship that year. He switched to the Ginetta GT5 Challenge Sweden for the 2013 season, he won the championship that year, with 95 points.

In February 2014, it was announced that Dons would make his British GT debut with Century Motorsport driving a Ginetta G55 GT4, partnering Aleksander Schjerpen. They ended the championship 5th in the GT4 standings.

In May 2015 Dons switched to the European Le Mans Series, driving a Ginetta Juno LMP3 for the University of Bolton team, partnering Rob Garofall.

Racing record

Complete British GT Championship results
(key) (Races in bold indicate pole position) (Races in italics indicate fastest lap)

Complete European Le Mans Series results

* Season still in progress.

References

External links
 
 Morten Dons official website
 
 

1988 births
Living people
Danish racing drivers
British GT Championship drivers
European Le Mans Series drivers
People from Struer Municipality
Sportspeople from the Central Denmark Region
24H Series drivers
Le Mans Cup drivers